I'm a Celebrity...Get Me Out of Here! (often referred to as I'm a Celebrity) is an American reality television series based on the British television show of the same name, in which celebrities live in jungle conditions with few comforts.

History
The series, broadcast on ITV since August 2002, is produced by ITV Studios (previously known as Granada Productions), a British company. The format was picked up by ABC soon after, which aired for one season in early 2003. The new series, shown on NBC in 2009, ran for 14 episodes, and followed the same format as the United Kingdom version of the same show. On March 8, 2010, NBC announced that there would not be a third season.

Celebrity Castle
On October 21, 2021, it was reported that ITV Studios subsidiary ITV America was pitching a reboot of the series under the title Celebrity Castle, with Blumhouse Productions—a studio known for its production of horror films—as co-producer. The pitch was reported to have been influenced by series 20 of the UK version, which moved from Australia to Gwrych Castle in Wales due to COVID-19 travel restrictions.

Series overview
Key:
 King of the Jungle

Main series results
Colour key
 Winner
 Runner-up
 Third place
 Left due to reasons other than eviction (walking out/illness etc)
 Late arrival.

Season 1 (2003)
The first season had 10 contestants. It aired nightly from February 19, 2003, to March 5, 2003, on ABC. John Lehr was the host from the Australian outback.  The time differential created serious issues with the live feed.

Season 2 (2009)

NBC picked up the former ABC show. It aired for 14 episodes and followed the UK show's format. The series premiered with a two-hour episode 8-10 PM EDT on June 1, 2009.  It aired with a two-hour episode at 8-10 PM every Monday and at 8-9 PM Tuesday through Thursday until its June 24 finale. MTV subsequently showed a marathon (adding unaired footage and commentary from cast members) of the preceding week's episodes on Sundays. The location of the second season was the jungle of Costa Rica. Lou Diamond Phillips won in what was, according to Damien Fahey, a close vote between him and Torrie.

References

External links
 
 Official website (ABC version)
 Official website (NBC version)

USA
American television series based on British television series
NBC original programming
American Broadcasting Company original programming
Television series by ITV Studios
2003 American television series debuts
2003 American television series endings
2009 American television series debuts
2009 American television series endings
2000s American reality television series
English-language television shows
American television series revived after cancellation
Television shows set in New South Wales
Television shows set in Costa Rica